Yves Héroux (born April 27, 1965) is a Canadian retired professional ice hockey right winger who played in one game in the National Hockey League with the Quebec Nordiques during the 1986–87 season. The rest of his career, which lasted from 1984 to 2000, was mainly spent in the minor leagues.

Career statistics

Regular season and playoffs

See also
 List of players who played only one game in the NHL

External links
 

1965 births
Living people
Albany Choppers players
Atlanta Knights players
Augsburger Panther players
Baltimore Skipjacks players
Canadian expatriate ice hockey players in Austria
Canadian expatriate ice hockey players in Germany
Canadian expatriate ice hockey players in Slovenia
Canadian ice hockey right wingers
Chicoutimi Saguenéens (QMJHL) players
EC Graz players
Flint Spirits players
Fredericton Express players
HC Sierre players
HDD Olimpija Ljubljana players
Ice hockey people from Quebec
Indianapolis Ice players
Kalamazoo Wings (1974–2000) players
Muskegon Lumberjacks players
New Jersey Rockin' Rollers players
People from Terrebonne, Quebec
Peoria Rivermen (IHL) players
Quebec Nordiques draft picks
Quebec Nordiques players
San Diego Barracudas players
Schwenninger Wild Wings players
Worcester IceCats players